Asociația Club Sportiv Mostiștea Ulmu, commonly known as Mostiștea Ulmu, or simply as Ulmu, is a Romanian football club based in Ulmu, Călărași County. Founded in 2005 as Phoenix Ulmu, the club situated on the banks of Mostiștea Lake reached the third tier on four occasions, a 2nd place being their best ranking.

Mostiștea is currently playing in the Liga III.

History 
Mostiștea Ulmu was founded in 2005 as Phoenix Ulmu and promoted for the first time in the Liga III after only one season. Distributed in the second series, Phoenix was ranked only 17th out of 18 and relegated back to Liga IV. In 2010, under the ownership of Vasile Tîrșolea, Phoenix won again Liga IV – Călărași County and after a promotion play-off against Nova Force Giurgiu, Giurgiu County champions, the team from Ulmu advanced again in the third tier.

After a first season in which the team finished 9th and saved from relegation, Phoenix chose to withdraw from the championship during the 2011–12 edition and disappeared for two years from the scene of the Romanian football.

Enrolled in 2013 in the Liga V – Călărași County, fifth tier of the Romanian football league system, Phoenix Ulmu failed to stand out for the next years being ranked 6th and 4th, then was excluded from the league during the 2015–16 season due to financial problems. This second exclusion was also the last for Phoenix which was now officially dissolved.

In August 2016, Commune of Ulmu re-founded the football team under the name of Mostiștea Ulmu, name given after the Mostiștea Lake that is in the proximity of the locality. At short time after, the Romanian businessman and ex-owner of the team, Vasile Tîrșolea took the control of the football club and in only three seasons managed to promote the club from Liga V to Liga III, road that included a promotion play-off and a surprising victory against the better rated champion of Bucharest, historic club FC Carmen.

Grounds
Mostiștea Ulmu plays its home matches on Ulmu Stadium in Ulmu, Călărași County, with a capacity of 1,000 seats. In the past the club also played its home matches on Romprim Stadium in Bucharest, with a capacity of 2,000 seats. In 2020, for a short period, Mostiștea Ulmu plays its home matches on Ion Comșa Stadium in Călărași, with a capacity of 10,400 seats, then moved again, on Voința Sports Base, in Bucharest, with a capacity of 2,500 seats.

Honours

Leagues
Liga III  
Runners-up (2): 2019–20, 2020–21
Liga IV – Călărași County
Winners (3): 2008–09, 2009–10, 2018–19
Liga V – Călărași County
Runners-up (1): 2016–17

Cups
Cupa României
Fourth Round: 2020–21
Cupa României – Călărași County
Winners (2): 2017–18, 2018–19

Players

First team squad

Out on loan

Club officials

Board of directors

Current technical staff

Notable former managers

 Ionel Augustin
 Augustin Călin

League history

References

External links
Mostiștea Ulmu at soccerway.com
Mostiștea Ulmu at AJF Călărași

http://www.mostisteaulmu.ro/

Association football clubs established in 2005
Football clubs in Călărași County
Liga III clubs
Liga IV clubs
2005 establishments in Romania